Franklin Milton Davis Jr. (July 19, 1918 – May 4, 1981) was an author and major general in the United States Army.

Early life and education 
General Davis was born in Malden, Massachusetts and raised in Waltham, Massachusetts. He earned a A.B. in Economics/English from Massachusetts State College in 1940. Davis was commissioned as a second lieutenant of cavalry through the Army ROTC program on June 10, 1940. He reported for active duty with the 3rd U.S. Cavalry at Fort Myer, Virginia on July 5, 1940. Davis transferred to the Regular Army on February 20, 1942 and graduated from the Command and General Staff School in January 1944. He later graduated from the Armed Forces Staff College in January 1958 and the Army War College in June 1960. Davis received an M.A. degree in International Affairs from George Washington University in 1963.

Military 
Davis had military participation in both World War II and the Vietnam War. Between wars, he commanded the 82nd Reconnaissance Battalion, 2nd Armored Division in Europe from July 1951 to June 1952.

Davis served as a brigadier general during the Vietnam War and commanded the 199th Light Infantry Brigade from May 1968 to July 1969. Davis' brigade operated in the Long Binh and Duc Hoa regions of Vietnam. While in Vietnam, Davis was wounded in action (WIA).

Davis received a temporary promotion to major general on June 1, 1970 which was made permanent on April 5, 1971. He was a commandant of the U.S. Army War College from 1971 to 1974, when he retired from active duty.

Davis's principal awards and decorations included two Distinguished Service Medals, the Distinguished Flying Cross, two awards of the Legion of Merit, the Purple Heart and the Bronze Star Medal with V for Valor. His wartime service included three major campaigns in World War II in Europe, and four in the war in Vietnam.

Transcendental Meditation 
Davis was a practitioner of Transcendental Meditation and advocated its use to reduce the stress of soldiers. He was also a founding member of the Board of Trustees at Maharishi International University (MIU) (now called Maharishi University of Management). At MIU, General Davis was also an International Resource Faculty member for the United States in Military Science.

Writing 
In 1950, Davis wrote for a contest that was designed to "stimulate creative writing among [military] personnel during their off-duty time." He was among three winners of the Army-wide writing contest. One of the prizes for the honor was to be published in Collier's magazine.

Davis wrote books of fiction and historical nonfiction. Two of his early books were published with his military rank attached to his name: "Col. Franklin M. Davis Jr.":
 Kiss the Tiger, (A Quinn Leland Espionage Thriller) Pyramid Books, 1961
 The U.S. Army Engineers—Fighting Elite, Franklin Watts, 1967 
Davis' books published without rank are:
 The Naked and the Lost, Lion, 1954. Subject is the Korean War, 1950–1953
 Spearhead, Permabook, 1957.  Subject 3rd Armored Division (Spearhead) during World War II.
 A Medal For Frankie, Pocket Books, 1959. 35 cents.
 Break Through, 1961
 Bamboo Camp #10, 1962
 Secret Hong Kong  (A Quinn Leland Espionage Thriller), 1962
 Combat! The Counterattack, (Illustrated by Arnie Kohn), 1964
 Come As a Conqueror, (The United States Army's Occupation of Germany 1945–1949. Nonfiction), 1967
 Across the Rhine (Time Life, World War II Collector's Edition), 1980

Personal 
Davis married Erma Stuart Alvord (September 17, 1918 – August 28, 2003) at Fort Benning, Georgia on July 18, 1942. They had two sons and three grandchildren. Their eldest son, First Lieutenant Stephen Winfield Davis (November 6, 1943 – August 18, 1967), was killed in action in Vietnam. General Davis had arrived in Vietnam for the first time only two weeks before and accompanied the body back to the United States for burial.

Davis and his wife lived in Arlington, Virginia. He died from cancer at the Walter Reed Army Medical Center in Washington, D.C. at age 62. After his death, his wife moved to Charleston, South Carolina to be closer to their younger son and his family. Davis is buried alongside his wife and eldest son at Arlington National Cemetery.

References

See also 
 Page from August 6, 1968 of Baton Rouge Morning Advocate, has picture of General Davis with following caption: "Wounded-Brig. Gen. Franklin M. Davis Jr. of Waltham, Mass., bleeds from a gash over his right eye and other cuts on his face after being wounded by a Viet Cong rocket while on a river patrol today, 13 miles southeast of Saigon. Brig. Gen. Davis is commander of the U.S. 199th Light Infantry Brigade which operates south, southeast and west of Saigon.''

1918 births
1981 deaths
People from Malden, Massachusetts
People from Waltham, Massachusetts
University of Massachusetts Amherst alumni
Military personnel from Massachusetts
United States Army personnel of World War II
United States Army Command and General Staff College alumni
Joint Forces Staff College alumni
United States Army War College alumni
Elliott School of International Affairs alumni
United States Army generals
United States Army personnel of the Vietnam War
Recipients of the Distinguished Flying Cross (United States)
Recipients of the Legion of Merit
Recipients of the Distinguished Service Medal (US Army)
American thriller writers
American military historians
American military writers
20th-century American novelists
20th-century American historians
American male novelists
American male non-fiction writers
20th-century American male writers
People from Arlington County, Virginia
Deaths from cancer in Washington, D.C.
Burials at Arlington National Cemetery